Midaflur (INN; EXP 338) is an extremely stable 3-imidazoline derivative with central skeletal muscle relaxant and sedative properties in humans and other species of mammals, exhibiting consistently high oral bioavailability and a long duration of action. While its pharmacodynamics remain poorly understood, midaflur resembles meprobamate and pentobarbital in terms of observed effects while being considerably more potent.

See also 
 Propofol
 Pentobarbital

References 

General anesthetics
Hypnotics
Sedatives
Trifluoromethyl compounds
Imidazolines